Christopher Anderson  (30 August 1925 – 27 May 1986) was a Scottish footballer, educator and football administrator. He is best remembered for his time as Vice-Chairman of Aberdeen F.C., where he was regarded as one of the game's most forward-thinking and innovative characters. Anderson was appointed an Officer of the Order of the British Empire (OBE) in the 1981 Birthday Honours, and was inducted into the Aberdeen FC "Hall of Fame" as one of the founding members in 2003.

Playing and coaching career

Anderson was born and grew up in Aberdeen, and showed promise as a player from an early age. He was capped by Scotland Schoolboys and joined the Junior team Mugiemoss as a teenager. Bill Struth, manager of Rangers, expressed an interest in the young Anderson, but instead he signed for his local team in 1943.

Wartime delayed his senior debut until 1948, and his time as a player at Pittodrie coincided with a lean period in the club's fortunes. One of the few highlights of his time there as a player was a Scottish Cup tie in 1950 against Celtic at Parkhead, in which Anderson scored the only goal. This was the first time that Aberdeen had beaten Celtic in a cup tie in Glasgow.

During his time as an Aberdeen player, Anderson spent a short period at Hartlepools United, playing only two games for the English club. According to the Aberdeen official website, he was only denied senior international honours by a knee injury sustained playing against Celtic. In 1953, Anderson was transferred to Arbroath, where he ended his playing career.

Anderson was forced to give up the game in 1956 following a series of injuries, but stayed with Arbroath as assistant to the manager, Tommy Gray. The following season, he was appointed chief coach (rather than manager) in place of Gray, and steered Arbroath to promotion in 1958–59. The following campaign in the first division ended in relegation, however, and Anderson was replaced as manager by John Prentice before the end of the season.

Educator and Administrator

Anderson joined the board of directors at Aberdeen in 1967, and was made vice-chairman three years later. He also had a distinguished career in education, and before his retirement he was secretary of RGIT, a prominent technology college, later granted university status. His OBE was awarded for services to both education and sport, but it is as a football administrator and visionary that he is best known.

Anderson's time on the board at Aberdeen coincided with the most successful period in the club's history, and he is considered to have been a driving force behind that success. As well as being instrumental in the development of Pittodrie as one of the first all-seater stadia in Britain, he was a prime mover in the creation of the Scottish Premier Division in 1975, a response to the declining attendances of the time.

As a member of the Aberdeen board, he was responsible for the appointment of Alex Ferguson as manager in 1978. Ferguson noted that

Death

Anderson took early retirement from his post at RGIT in 1984, intending to focus more of his energies on running the football club as chairman. However, following an operation to correct a hernia in 1984, he noticed a stiffness in his right side, which was diagnosed as motor neurone disease. He continued to serve on the Aberdeen board in spite of his increasing disability, and was still well enough to attend the 1985 Scottish League Cup Final victory over Hibs. He realised that this would be his last visit to Hampden Park:

By the time of the 1986 Scottish Cup Final, later that season, Anderson was unable to move independently, and was only able to communicate with technological assistance. He died 17 days later, at the age of 60.

The Chris Anderson Stadium in Aberdeen is named after him.

Honours

Manager
Arbroath
Forfarshire Cup : 1957-58
Scottish Second Division promotion :1958-59

References

Scottish footballers
Aberdeen F.C. players
Arbroath F.C. players
Hartlepool United F.C. players
Footballers from Aberdeen
Officers of the Order of the British Empire
1925 births
1986 deaths
Directors of football clubs in Scotland
Association football wing halves
Scottish football managers
Arbroath F.C. managers
Aberdeen F.C. directors and chairmen
People associated with Robert Gordon University
Scottish Football League players
English Football League players
Scottish Football League managers
Dyce Juniors F.C. players
20th-century Scottish businesspeople